The following are the European records in Olympic weightlifting. Records are maintained in each weight class for the snatch lift, clean and jerk lift, and the total for both lifts by the European Weightlifting Federation (EWF).

Current records
Key to tables:

Men

Women

Historical records

Men (1998–2018)

Women (1998–2018)

References

External links
 EWF web site
 European Weightlifting Records – Men September 2022 udpated
 European Weightlifting Records – Women September 2022 udpated

 
Olympic records
European
Weightlifting, Olympic